Billroth I, more formally Billroth's operation I, is an operation in which the pylorus is removed and the distal stomach is anastomosed directly to the duodenum.

The operation is most closely associated with Theodor Billroth, but was first described by Polish surgeon Ludwik Rydygier.

The surgical procedure is called a gastroduodenostomy.

See also
 Anatomical terms of location
 Billroth II
 Roux-en-Y anastomosis

References

External links
 Schematic of Billroth I & II - thefreedictionary.com.

General surgery
Digestive system surgery